Gary Jacobson (born c. 1953) is an American former PGA Tour professional golfer. He finished in a tie for fifth at the 1977 U.S. Open.

He played on the PGA Tour in 1978, making only two cuts in 15 tournaments.

As of May 1979, Jacobson was beginning to change careers. He was learning to be a sales representative at Northern Printing of Minneapolis.

See also 

 Fall 1977 PGA Tour Qualifying School graduates

References

American male golfers
PGA Tour golfers
Arizona State Sun Devils men's golfers
People from Minnetonka, Minnesota
Year of birth uncertain
1953 births
Living people